John McRae (Rae) Eddie (August 23, 1900 – February 6, 1977) was a Canadian politician, who served as a Member of the Legislative Assembly of British Columbia from 1952 to 1969, representing the riding of New Westminster. He was a member of the Co-operative Commonwealth Federation, which became the New Democratic Party.

He was born in Ontario, of Scottish descent, and was educated in Saskatchewan. Eddie later moved to British Columbia, where he married Norma Sutherland. He worked in the lumber industry. Eddie defeated former premier Byron Ingemar Johnson to win a seat in the provincial assembly in 1952. He died in New Westminster at the age of 76.

References

British Columbia New Democratic Party MLAs
1900 births
1976 deaths
British Columbia Co-operative Commonwealth Federation MLAs
20th-century Canadian politicians